William Davies (19 March 1881 – 22 June 1942) was a Canadian sports shooter. He competed in the men's trap event at the 1912 Summer Olympics.

References

1881 births
1942 deaths
Canadian male sport shooters
Olympic shooters of Canada
Shooters at the 1912 Summer Olympics
Sportspeople from Merthyr Tydfil
Welsh emigrants to Canada
Welsh male sport shooters
20th-century Canadian people